The following list includes notable people who were born or have lived in Highland Park, Illinois. For a similar list organized alphabetically by last name, see the category page People from Highland Park, Illinois.

Academics and sciences

 Elisha Gray, invented and demonstrated a telephone in 1874; his Hazel Avenue house still stands
 Dr. John Grunsfeld, astronaut
 Eric Isaacs, director of Argonne National Laboratory and a professor at University of Chicago; lived in Highland Park
 Dr. John Preskill, professor at the California Institute of Technology
 Dr. Jeremy Siegel, Russell E. Palmer Professor of Finance at the Wharton School of the University of Pennsylvania
 Dr. Graham Spanier, president of Penn State University
 Dr. Peter Suber, leader in the movement for open access to research  
 Aaron Swartz, pioneer in internet technology and activism for free digital culture

Arts and entertainment

 Craig Bolotin, screenwriter, film director
 Alex Borstein, actress
 Paul Brickman, film director
 Rachel Brosnahan, actress
 Patrick Burns, reality TV star (Haunting Evidence)
 Jacqueline Carey, fantasy fiction novelist
 Mickie Caspi, artist
 Billy Corgan, lead singer and founder of the band Smashing Pumpkins
 Blag Dahlia, singer in The Dwarves
 Eric Engberg, broadcast journalist
 Brenda Ferber, author
 Jennie Fields, writer, author of Crossing Brooklyn Ferry, Lily Beach, and The Middle Ages
 Brett Gelman, actor
 Michael Gelman, producer, Live With Regis and Kelly
 Stephen Glass, discredited magazine journalist
 James Goldman, screenwriter and playwright, author of The Lion in Winter
 William Goldman, Academy Award-winning screenwriter, author of The Princess Bride
 F. Gary Gray, film director
Chief Keef, rapper and producer
 Brian Levant, film director
 Donald Lipski, artist
 Sebastian Maniscalco, comedian
 Richard Marx, singer-songwriter, producer
 Jeff Melvin, television writer and producer
 Ken Olin, actor, director, producer
 Peter Orner, author
 Jeff Perry, actor
 Cory Provus, baseball broadcaster
 Robert Reed, actor
 Ben Savage, actor
 Fred Savage, actor and director
 Kala Savage, actress and singer
 Josh Server, actor
 Robert Seyfarth, architect
 Gary Sinise, actor
 Grace Slick, of the band Jefferson Airplane, born in Highland Park
 Harold Ramis, actor and director
 Brandon Ratcliff, actor
 Brian Ross, broadcast journalist
 David Seltzer, screenwriter, producer, and director
 Gene Siskel, film critic
 George Kirke Spoor, film pioneer
 Lauren Tom, actress
 D.B. Weiss, co-creator of Game of Thrones TV series
 Orson Welles, actor and director
 Edward Weston, photographer
 Dan Witz, artist
 Dean Zelinsky, founder of Dean Guitars

Business 
 Anthony Saliba, (born 1955), author & businessman
 Steve Sarowitz (born 1965/1966), American billionaire, founder of Paylocity

Military 

 Major General "Terrible Terry" Allen, World War II commander of 1st Infantry Division; featured on the cover of Time magazine
 General Mark W. Clark, US Army general (World War II and the Korean War), lived in Highland Park
Stansfield Turner, Admiral, U.S. Navy and Director of the Central Intelligence Agency, was a graduate of Highland Park High School.
 General Jonathan M. Wainwright, commander of Allied forces in the Philippines at the time of their surrender to the Empire of Japan, attended Highland Park High School

Politics and law 

 Lane Bray, Washington state legislator; born in Highland Park
 Bill Cassidy, United States senator from Louisiana and former member of the United States House of Representatives; born in Highland Park
 Lauren Beth Gash, Illinois state legislator and lawyer; lived in Highland Park
 Mark Kirk, United States senator; lived in Highland Park
 Fayette S. Munro, Illinois state legislator and lawyer; lived in Highland Park
 Daniel M. Pierce, Illinois state legislator who served three nonconsecutive terms as Mayor of Highland Park; lifelong resident.
 Rob Sherman, atheist activist, perennial candidate, and businessman; grew up in Highland Park
 Jill Stein, 2012 and 2016 Green Party presidential candidate; grew up in Highland Park
 Grace Mary Stern, Illinois state legislator; lived in Highland Park
 Stansfield Turner, United States admiral and Director of Central Intelligence; born in Highland Park
 David Shulkin, United States Secretary of Veterans Affairs
 Howard R. Slater, Illinois state legislator and lawyer; lived in Highland Park
 Paul Soglin, mayor of Madison, Wisconsin graduated from Highland Park High School

Sports

Baseball 

 Ross Baumgarten, pitcher for the Chicago White Sox and Pittsburgh Pirates, was born in Highland Park
 Ryan Borucki, relief pitcher for the Toronto Blue Jays, was born in Highland Park
 Tony Cogan, relief pitcher for the Kansas City Royals, attended Highland Park High School

Basketball 

 Michael Jordan, iconic basketball player for the Chicago Bulls, six-time NBA champion, Olympic gold medalist, lived in Highland Park
 Toni Kukoč, forward for the Chicago Bulls and other NBA teams, lives in Highland Park
 Scottie Pippen, Chicago Bulls forward, six-time NBA champion and Basketball Hall-of-Famer

Football 

 Tunch Ilkin, offensive tackle for Pittsburgh Steelers and Green Bay Packers, sports broadcaster, attended Highland Park High School
 Hugh "Shorty" Ray, football official, member of Pro Football Hall of Fame, was born in Highland Park

Gymnastics

 Jasmine Kerber, U.S. National rhythmic gymnast, resides in Highland Park

Hockey 

 Billy Jaffe, hockey analyst, born in Highland Park
 David Meckler, professional hockey player, was born in Highland Park

Skating 

 Jason Brown, figure skater, 2015 national champion and medalist at 2014 Winter Olympics in Sochi, Russia, attended Highland Park High School

Tennis 

Seymour Greenberg (1920–2006), tennis player; lived in Highland Park
 Robert Wrenn (1873–1925), tennis player; won the US Championship Men's Singles title four times, was born in Highland Park

Motorsports 

Brian Redman, champion road racing driver, lived and worked in Highland Park when driving for Carl Haas

References

Highland Park
Highland Park